Ananda Sastralaya (sinhala: ආනන්ද ශාස්ත්‍රාලය) is a public boys school located in Kotte, Sri Lanka. It was founded in 1890 as Kotte Buddhist English Mixed School. In 1952 a part of the school land was designated by the Government as an archaeological site since an ancient tunnel junction erected in the 16th century was found within the school premises.

History
As the awakening of Buddhist education system in Ceylon during the 19th century, some of the leaders in Kotte area set up a new school, Kotte Bauddha Mishra Vidyalaya - කෝට්ටේ බෞද්ධ මිශ්‍ර විද්‍යාලය (Kotte Buddhist Boys' School), on 4 November 1880. Initially the school was operated in small scale with very few facilities. On 1 January 1890 the Ven. Emulgama Wimalatissa Thera with Dayaka Sabha of Kotte Raja Maha Vihara proceeded to enhance the facilities of the school and changed the school's name to Kotte Bauddha (Buddhist) English Mixed School.

The first principal of the school was C. Ranasingha (1890–1903), who was followed by D. B. Jayatilaka (1903–1905). In 1910 the name of the school was changed to Jayawardena Shasthra Shalava, whilst D. J. Jayatunga (1905–1922) was appointed as the school's third principal.

After the establishment of Buddhist Theosophical Society, Jayawardena Shasthra Shalava took over the administration of the school. The administration renamed the school, Ananda Sastralaya, and appointed the former principal of Ananda College, S. P. Perera, as the school's principal.

In 1934, Dr. E. W. Adikaram, renowned educator, writer and social activist took on the duties of the principal of Ananda Sastralaya and his period was known as the golden age of the school. He made a vital contribution to the renaissance of Buddhist education. With the help of many donours and a large number of social workers, hee bought another 13 acre land from the Pagoda area and built the hostel and sports ground of Ananda Sastralaya. Later, he used the resources used to mark the beginning of another Buddhist school in Kotte at that time. Later, this school was named as "Ananda Sastralaya Junior School (No. 02)".

During the second World War the school premises was taken over by the Ceylon Army for the use as an army camp. After the war, the school was re-established. Under the 1961 Parliamentary Act passed by the Government, all the educational institutes were taken under to one national system of education, whereby all the schools that were managed by the Buddhist Theosophical Society were transferred across to the Government.

In the 1960s, Stanley Thilakarathne, a former MP from Kotte (who was selected as the speaker of the parliament later) pointed out the need for a girls' college in Kotte and reserved an unused land plot in the 13 acre land in the Pagoda Ananda Sastralaya Junior School No. 2. New Girls' School was established on 11 January 1971 as  "Ananda Balika Vidyalaya, Kotte."

Sports

Houses 
The students of the Ananda Sastralaya are divided into four houses. These are:
Paravi - Colour -  Red
Kokila - Colour -  Green
Thisara - Colour -  Red
Mayura - Colour -  Blue

An athletic tournament among these houses is held once a year at the beginning of the first term.

Past principals

Notable alumni

See also
Ananda Balika Vidyalaya, Kotte
Ananda Sastralaya, Matugama
Ananda College, Colombo-10

References

External links
Location of Ananda Sastralaya

Buddhist schools in Sri Lanka
Boys' schools in Sri Lanka
Provincial schools in Sri Lanka
Boarding schools in Sri Lanka
Schools in Sri Jayawardenepura Kotte
Archaeological sites in Sri Lanka
Educational institutions established in 1890
1890 establishments in Ceylon